Torregrotta railway station is a railway station serving the small town of Torregrotta, in the north-east of Sicily, Italy. The station also serves nearby villages including Monforte San Giorgio, Roccavaldina and Valdina. It is located on the Palermo–Messina railway and  all trains calling there are operated by Trenitalia. The current station, opened on 23 November 2009, replaces an earlier one dating from the early years of the twentieth century and closed on 9 August 2009.

History
The section between Messina and San Filippo of the Palermo-Messina Railway was opened on 20 June 1889 but no passenger facilities were provided at Torregrotta until the early years of the twentieth century. 
The first  station was originally opened as Scala and later renamed as Roccavaldina - Scala - Torregrotta. It was  equipped with an important goods station where  a large amount of agricultural products came from surrounding crops. 
The works for the construction of a new station were contracted in 1999 and began in 2000. On 9 August 2009 the first station was closed and on 23 November 2009 the new station was opened as Torregrotta.

Services
The typical weekday service from the station is thirty-five trains per day. On Sundays the service is reduced to nine trains.

See also
Berlin–Palermo railway axis
List of railway stations in Sicily
Railway stations in Italy
Rail transport in Italy
History of rail transport in Italy

References

Bibliography

External links

Railway stations in Sicily
Railway stations opened in 2009